World's End or Worlds End may refer to:

Arts and entertainment

Literature

Novels
 World's End (Boyle novel), a 1987 novel by T. Coraghessan Boyle
 World's End (Chadbourn novel), a 2000 novel by Mark Chadbourn
 World's End (Sinclair novel), a 1940 novel by Upton Sinclair
 World's End, the third and final book in the Phoenix Rising trilogy
 The World's End series, four children's novels (1970-1973) by Monica Dickens

Short story
The World's End (short story), a 1927 short story by Agatha Christie

Comics
 "World's End" (comics), a 2008–2009 comic book crossover storyline in the Wildstorm Universe
 World's End (manga), a sequel to Dear Myself by Eiki Eiki
 The Sandman: Worlds' End, part of the DC comic book series The Sandman

Television
 World's End (TV series), a 2015 British mystery drama television series that aired on CBBC
 "World's End" (Cold Case), a television episode
 "World's End", first episode of the 1964 Doctor Who serial The Dalek Invasion of Earth

Film
 The World's End (film), a 2013 British science fiction comedy film directed by Edgar Wright and starring Simon Pegg
 Pirates of the Caribbean: At World's End, a 2007 film
 Ved verdens ende (At World's End), a 2009 Danish action comedy film

Places

Australia
 Worlds End, South Australia, a locality
 Worlds End Highway, a road in South Australia

Norway
Verdens Ende (World's End), at the tip of Tjøme Island, southern Norway

Sri Lanka
World's End, Sri Lanka, a sheer precipice with a 1050 m drop in the highlands of Sri Lanka; see Horton Plains National Park

United Kingdom
World's End, Berkshire, a village in Berkshire
World's End, Buckinghamshire
World's End, West Sussex, the name of a northern area of Burgess Hill
World's End, Kensington and Chelsea, district of Chelsea, London at the end of Kings Road
World's End, Denbighshire, an area in the Eglwyseg valley north of Llangollen, Wales
World's End, Enfield, an area in the London Borough of Enfield between Enfield Town and Oakwood
Worlds End, Hampshire
Worlds End, Solihull, see list of areas in Solihull

United States
 World's End (Hingham), a park and conservation area in Hingham, Massachusetts
Worlds End State Park, Pennsylvania

Buildings 
The World's End, Camden, a pub in Camden Town, London, England
The World's End, Chelsea, a pub in Chelsea, London, England
The World's End, Fraserburgh, listed building
World's End Inn, a former use of Grove House, Harrogate, England
World's End, a pub in Edinburgh, Scotland, associated with the World's End Murders

See also
End of the world (disambiguation)
Land's End (disambiguation)